East Maine School District 63, otherwise known as District 63 or East Maine School District 63, is a school district that serves parts of Des Plaines, Niles, Glenview, Park Ridge, and Morton Grove that reside in the Maine Township. The school district is headquartered in Des Plaines.

The school district consists of seven schools, six of which are elementary schools and one being a junior high school. 8th-grade graduates are sent to Maine Township High School District 207, along with CCSD 62, and Park Ridge-Niles SD 64.

Schools

Based on 2017-18 Illinois Report Cards.

Demographics
About 80% of the student population lives in houses that speak two or more languages. Out of 3,463 students, 31.6% of the student population is White, 28% Asian, 25% Hispanic, 11.1% with two or more races, 3.8% Black, 0.2% Pacific Islander, and 0.1% American Indian. 53% of students live in low income and 2% are homeless. 39% of the student population are English learners and 15% of students have IEPs.

Leadership
District 63 employs a school board and a group of administrators to govern the district. The school board is made up of seven members, one of which is a president and another one being a vice president.

References

External links
  East Maine School District 63 website

Des Plaines, Illinois
Glenview, Illinois
School districts in Cook County, Illinois
Park Ridge, Illinois
Niles, Illinois
Morton Grove, Illinois